Kunzea is a genus of plants in the family Myrtaceae and is endemic to Australasia. They are shrubs, sometimes small trees and usually have small, crowded, rather aromatic leaves. The flowers are similar to those of plants in the genus Leptospermum but differ in having stamens that are longer than the petals. Most kunzeas are endemic to Western Australia but a few occur in eastern Australia and a few are found in New Zealand. The taxonomy of the genus is not settled and is complicated by the existence of a number of hybrids.

Description
Plants in the genus Kunzea are shrubs or small trees, usually with their leaves arranged alternately along the branches. The flowers are arranged in clusters near the ends of the branches, which in some species, continue to grow after flowering. The flowers of most species lack a stalk but those that have one are usually solitary or in groups of two or three. In some species, the flowers are surrounded by enlarged bracts. There are five petals, five sepals and a large number of stamens which are always longer than the petals. The fruit is a usually a woody capsule. Kunzeas are similar to species in other genera of the Myrtaceae, especially Leptospermum but are distinguished from that genus by having stamens that are longer than the petals.

Taxonomy and naming
The first formal description of a kunzea was published in 1828 by Ludwig Reichenbach in his book Conspectus Regni Vegetabilis. Reichenbach referred to three species – K. capitata, K. ericifolia and K. corifolia (now K. ambigua) – but did not nominate a type species. In 1981, Hellmut Toelken nominated K. capitata as the type species. Reichenbach named the genus after his "distinguished friend", the German naturalist Gustav Kunze, professor of botany in Leipzig. The taxonomy of the genus is not settled and hybrids often occur where two species occur in the same area.

Distribution
The majority of Kunzea species are endemic to the south-west of Western Australia but there are species in every Australian state and in New Zealand.

Use in horticulture
Some species of Kunzea are suitable for use in gardens. Kunzea ambigua is described as a "handsome shrub which attracts numerous birds and colourful soldier beetles when in flower". A form of this species from southern Victoria reputedly flowers profusely with sprays of scented flowers. Kunzea capitata and K. pulchella are red-flowering species from Western Australia and are described as "indeed outstanding" although they are sometimes difficult to establish in eastern states and need to be grafted onto hardier rootstock.

Species
Sourced from the authoritative Australian Plant Name Index and Australian Plant Census  and the Kew Gardens World Checklist of Selected Plant Families.

 Kunzea acicularis  – WA
 Kunzea acuminata  – WA
 Kunzea affinis  – WA 
 Kunzea amathicola , rawiritoa  – NZ
 Kunzea aristulata  – NSW
 Kunzea ambigua , tick bush – NSW, TAS, VIC 
 Kunzea axillaris  – NSW
 Kunzea badjaensis  – NSW
 Kunzea baxteri , scarlet kunzea  – WA
 Kunzea bracteolata  – NSW, QLD
 Kunzea caduca  – QLD
 Kunzea calida  – QLD
 Kunzea cambagei  – NSW
 Kunzea capitata , pink kunzea  – NSW, QLD
 Kunzea ciliata  – WA
 Kunzea cincinnata  – WA
 Kunzea clavata  – WA
 Kunzea dactylota  – NSW
 Kunzea ericifolia , spearwood, pondil – WA
 Kunzea ericoides , manuoea, titira, atitira, kanuka - NZ
 Kunzea eriocalyx   – WA
 Kunzea flavescens ,  – QLD
 Kunzea glabrescens , spearwood – WA
 Kunzea graniticola  – QLD
 Kunzea jucunda   – WA
 Kunzea juniperoides   – NSW
 Kunzea leptospermoides , Yarra burgan - VIC
 Kunzea linearis , rawiri manuka – NZ
 Kunzea micrantha  – WA
 Kunzea micromera  – WA
 Kunzea montana , mountain kunzea – WA
 Kunzea muelleri , yellow kunzea – NSW
 Kunzea newbeyi  – WA
 Kunzea obovata  – NSW, QLD
 Kunzea occidentalis  – NSW
 Kunzea opposita  – NSW, QLD
 Kunzea parvifolia , violet kunzea  – NSW, QLD, VIC
 Kunzea pauciflora  – WA
 Kunzea peduncularis  – VIC
 Kunzea petrophila  – NT
 Kunzea phylicoides   – NSW, VIC
 Kunzea pomifera , muntries – VIC, SA
 Kunzea praestans  – WA
 Kunzea preissiana  – WA
 Kunzea pulchella , granite kunzea – WA
 Kunzea recurva  – WA
 Kunzea robusta , manuka, kanuka, kopuka, rawirinui, maru, rauriki – NZ
 Kunzea × rosea  – WA
 Kunzea rostrata  – WA
 Kunzea rupestris  – NSW
 Kunzea salina  – WA
 Kunzea salterae  – NZ
 Kunzea sericothrix  – QLD
 Kunzea serotina , makahikatoa – NZ
 Kunzea similis  – WA
 Kunzea sinclairii , Great Barrier Island kanuka – NZ
 Kunzea spathulata   – WA
 Kunzea × squarrosa  – WA
 Kunzea strigosa  – WA
 Kunzea sulphurea  – WA
 Kunzea tenuicaulis , geothermal kanuka, geothermal kunzea, prostrate kanuka – NZ
 Kunzea toelkenii  – NZ
 Kunzea triregenis , Three Kings kanuka – NZ
 Kunzea truncata  –  QLD

Gallery

References

 
Myrtaceae genera
Taxa named by Ludwig Reichenbach
Australasian realm flora